Inosine-5′-monophosphate dehydrogenase (IMPDH) is a purine biosynthetic enzyme that catalyzes the nicotinamide adenine dinucleotide (NAD)-dependent oxidation of inosine monophosphate (IMP) to xanthosine monophosphate (XMP), the first committed and rate-limiting step towards the de novo biosynthesis of guanine nucleotides from IMP. IMPDH is a regulator of the intracellular guanine nucleotide pool, and is therefore important for DNA and RNA synthesis, signal transduction, energy transfer, glycoprotein synthesis, as well as other process that are involved in cellular proliferation.

Structure and function
IMPDH is a tetrameric enzyme, composed of monomeric subunits with molecular masses of approximately 55 kDa and generally consist of 400-500 residues.  Most IMPDH monomers contain two domains: a catalytic (β/α)8 barrel domain with an active site located in the loops at the C-terminal end of the barrel, and a subdomain consisting of two, repeated cystathionine beta synthetase (CBS) domains that are inserted within the dehydrogenase sequence. Monovalent cations have been shown to activate IMPDH enzymes and may serve to stabilize the conformation of the active-site loop.

The CBS domain is not required for catalytic activity. Mutations within the CBS subdomain or a complete deletion of the domains do not impair the in vitro catalytic activity of IMPDH. An in vivo deletion of the CBS subdomain in E. coli suggests that the domain can act as a negative transregulator of adenine nucleotide synthesis. IMPDH has also been shown to bind nucleic acids, and this function can be impaired by mutations that are located in the subdomain. The CBS subdomain has also been implicated in mediating IMPDH association with polyribosomes, which suggests a potential moonlighting role for IMPDH as a translational regulatory protein.

Drosophila IMPDH has been demonstrated to act as a sequence-specific transcriptional repressor that can reduce the expression of histone genes and E2F. IMPDH localizes to the nucleus at the end of the S phase and nuclear accumulation is mostly restricted to the G2 phase. In addition, metabolic stress has been shown to induce the nuclear localization of IMPDH.

Mechanism 

The overall reaction catalyzed by IMPDH is:

inosine 5'-phosphate + NAD+ + H2O  xanthosine 5'-phosphate + NADH + H+

The mechanism of IMPDH involves a sequence of two different chemical reactions: (1) a fast redox reaction involving a hydride transfer to NAD which generates NADH and an enzyme-bound XMP intermediate (E-XMP*) and (2) a hydrolysis step that releases XMP from the enzyme. IMP binds to the active site and a conserved cysteine residue attacks the 2-position of the purine ring. A hydride ion is then transferred from the C2 position to NAD and the E-XMP* intermediate is formed. NADH dissociates from the enzyme and a mobile active-site flap element moves a conserved catalytic dyad of arginine and threonine into the newly unoccupied NAD binding site. The arginine residue is thought to act as the general base that activates a water molecule for the hydrolysis reaction. Alternatively, molecular mechanics simulations suggest that in conditions where the arginine residue is protonated, the threonine residue is also capable of activating water by accepting a proton from water while transferring its own proton to a nearby residue.

In Humans
Humans express two distinct isozymes of IMPDH encoded by two distinct genes, IMPDH1 and IMPDH2:

Both isozymes contain 514 residues, have an 84% similarity in peptide sequence, and have similar kinetic properties.  Both isozymes are constitutively expressed in most tissues, but IMPDH1 is predominately expressed in the spleen, retina, and peripheral blood leukocytes. IMPDH1 is generally expressed constitutively at low levels, and IMPDH2 is generally upregulated in proliferating cells and neoplastic tissues. Homozygous IMPDH1 knockout mice demonstrate a mild retinopathy in which a slow, progressive form of retinal degeneration gradually weakens visual transduction, while homozygous IMPDH2 knockout mice display embryonic lethality.

Clinical significance 
Guanine nucleotide synthesis is essential for maintaining normal cell function and growth, and is also important for the maintenance of cell proliferation and immune responses. IMPDH expression is found to be upregulated in some tumor tissues and cell lines. B and T lymphocytes display a dependence on IMPDH for normal activation and function, and demonstrate upregulated IMPDH expression. Therefore, IMPDH has been addressed as a drug target for immunosuppressive and cancer chemotherapy.

Mycophenolate is an immunosuppressant that is used to prevent transplant rejection and acts through inhibition of IMPDH.

Mutations in the CBS region of IMPDH1 are associated with the RP10 form of autosomal dominant retinitis pigmentosa and dominant Leber's congenital amaurosis.

Research 
IMPDH inhibitors have been shown to prevent SARS-CoV-2 replication in cells and are being tested in clinical trials for COVID-19.

See also 
 Purine metabolism
 Xanthosine

References

Further reading 

 

EC 1.1.1
NADH-dependent enzymes
Enzymes of known structure